Mollabayramlı (formerly known as Ali Bayramli) is a village in the Kalbajar Rayon of Azerbaijan.

References

Populated places in Kalbajar District